The  Islamic Center of Irving (ICI) is a mosque and Islamic community center established and registered as a non-profit 501(c) organization in 1991 in Irving, Texas, USA.

Purpose
Irving is located in the heart of the Dallas-Fort Worth Metroplex. It is estimated that there are 100,000 Muslims in DFW Metroplex. The center's goal is to serve the Muslim population by providing a Mosque, which is a place to pray, and Islamic School of Irving. It also provides Islamic activities to strengthen the Islamic community ties socially and religiously.

Its mission statement is to provide a central Islamic Center for all people in the Irving and DFW Area, utilizing all avenues for Dawah, while providing an Islamic Environment and Comprehensive Islamic Education to the next generation.

History

The idea of establishing an Islamic center originated in the early 1980s when a group of Muslims started praying the five daily and the Jumu'ah (Friday) prayers together in one of their own houses. Soon they had to move to a bigger place, from one apartment to another until they were able to rent an apartment and use it as a Mosque where they performed all their prayers. The number of people praying continued to increase which required them to find a bigger place. In 1990, the group rented a house  that could accommodate about 75 people to use as the Mosque.

Not too long afterwards, the number of people praying exceeded 75, and some of them had to pray outside the house. A school for the children was held each weekend but had to close down eight months later because the place was not suitable for studying.

For many years the group had to move from one place to another, renting halls for the Friday prayers as the number of the people praying reached between 200 and 300 men and there was no place for women. Muslims in the group were prevented from praying in some of the halls.

Current building
The building on 2555 N Esters Road is fully functional and it has regular 5 times prayer in the masjid and a youth group to play basketball on their 2 full basketball courts. It can accommodate about 3000 worshipers for the weekly Jumu'ah prayer in 2 sessions. It also supports the Islamic School of Irving, sunday and summer school, marriage Services, funeral services, Quranic and Arabic Teachings, and even Sunday tours for the public to learn more about Islam.

See also
  List of mosques in the Americas
  Lists of mosques 
  List of mosques in the United States

References

External links
 

Mosques in Texas
1991 establishments in Texas
Islamic organizations established in 1991